A chief officer can refer to any of various leaders:

Military 
Chief petty officer
Chief warrant officer

Marine occupation 
Chief mate

Corporate title 

Collectively referred to as being part of the C-suite:

Business 
Chief executive officer
Chief operating officer
Chief information officer
Chief technical officer
Chief accounting officer
Chief administrative officer
Chief analytics officer
Chief channel officer
Chief compliance officer
Chief communications officer
Chief creative officer
Chief customer officer
Chief data officer
Chief financial officer
Chief governance officer
Chief information security officer
Chief knowledge officer 
Chief learning officer
Chief legal officer
Chief marketing officer
Chief networking officer
Chief process officer
Chief procurement officer
Chief risk officer
Chief security officer
Chief science officer
Chief strategy officer
Chief solutions officer
Chief sustainability officer
Chief technology officer
Chief visionary officer

Education 
Chief academic officer
Chief business officer

Government 
Chief Dental Officer (disambiguation)
Chief District Officer
Chief Electoral Officer (disambiguation)
Chief fire officer
Chief firearms officer
Chief Medical Officer
Chief police officer
Chief Veterinary Officer